The Rich and the Ruthless is an American streaming television comedy series created, produced and directed by Victoria Rowell. The series stars Rowell and Richard Brooks. The series is loosely based on Rowell's novels Secrets of a Soap Opera Diva and The Young and the Ruthless, and offers a behind-the-scenes look at the fictional soap opera.

The six-episode first season premiered on the streaming service Allblk on July 28, 2017. On August 24, 2017, the series was renewed for a second season. The third season premiered on May 23, 2019. The fourth season moved to BET+ and premiered on May 13, 2021.

The series received multiple awards and nominations, include Daytime Emmy Award nomination for an Outstanding Lead Actor in a Digital Daytime Drama Series for Brooks in 2018. In 2018 and 2019, the series won Indie Series Awards for Best Ensemble in a Comedy.

Cast and characters
Victoria Rowell as Kitty Barringer
 Richard Brooks as Augustus Barringer
 Valenzia Algarin as  Veronica Barringer
 Elaine Ballace as Fern
 Hunter Bodine	as Randall Roberts
 Elizabeth J. Carlisle as Emmy Abernathy
 Michael Colyar as Willie Turner
 Starletta DuPois as Grandma Jones
 Brenda Epperson as Edith Norman
 Carlo Mendez as Kurt
 Robert Ri'chard as  Max Barringer
 Alesha Renee as Calysta Jeffries
 Irene Roseen as Maeve Fielding
 Mykel Shannon Jenkins as  Derrick Taylor
 Shadoe Stevens as Phillip McQueen
 Chrystale Wilson as Alison Fairchild Roberts
 Gabrielle Sanalitro as Tamara
 Akilah Releford as Ivy
 Kimberlin Brown as Dr. Maya Cooper
 JoNell Kennedy as  Earthaletta
 Dawnn Lewis as  Beth

Episodes
</onlyinclude>

Season 1 (2017)

Season 2 (2018)

Season 3 (2019)

Season 4 (2021)

References

External links
 

2010s American satirical television series
2017 American television series debuts
2020s American satirical television series
2021 American television series endings
American television soap operas
BET+ original programming
English-language television shows
Television shows set in Los Angeles
Urban Movie Channel original programming